Kilisitina Moata'ane (born 23 November 1997) is a New Zealand rugby union player. She made her Black Ferns debut off the bench in a 47–10 victory over Australia in Perth on 10 August 2019.

Personal life 
Moata’ane is of Tongan heritage and was born in Auckland. Her family later moved to Dunedin where she was educated at Kavanagh College. She took up rugby as a teenager in Year 12 and is now a teacher aide at Otago Girls’ High School.

Career 
Moata’ane has previously represented Tonga at rugby league. She made her debut for Otago Spirit in 2014 at the age of 16. She has since scored 26 tries in 41 games for Otago. In 2017 she scored five tries against Tasman and in 2019 she helped Otago win the Farah Palmer Cup by scoring nine tries in six games. She scored four against North Harbour in Otago's round-robin win.

In 2018 she was selected for the European tour, but was injured at the pre-departure camp. The same thing happened to her again in 2019 when she was selected for the North American tour, she was ruled out with an injury.

Moata’ane played for the Possibles against the Probables in a Black Ferns trial match in 2020.

At the Dunedin Club Rugby Award in 2021 she was named women's player of the year. Moata’ane was named in the Matatū squad for the inaugural and historical season of Super Rugby Aupiki in 2022.

References

External links 

 Black Ferns Profile

1997 births
Living people
New Zealand women's international rugby union players
New Zealand female rugby union players
People educated at Trinity Catholic College, Dunedin